Semotrachia  is a genus of air-breathing land snails, terrestrial pulmonate gastropod mollusks in the family Camaenidae.

Species 
Species within the genus Semotrachia include:
 Semotrachia euzyga
 Semotrachia sublevata
 Semotrachia winneckeana

References 

 GBIF info on the genus

 
Camaenidae
Taxonomy articles created by Polbot